James Jeffry Tuck (3 June 1853 – 20 January 1918) was an English cricketer. Tuck was a right-handed batsman who bowled right-arm roundarm medium pace, who could also play as a wicketkeeper.

Tuck made his first-class debut for Hampshire against Kent in 1877. Tuck played four further matches in 1878.

In 1882, four years after last playing for Hampshire, Tuck played four matches with his final first-class match coming against Sussex in the same season.

In Tuck's nine matches for the county he scored 173 runs at a batting average of 11.73, with a high score of  32*. With the ball Tuck took 2 wickets at a bowling average of 18.00, with best figures of 1/11.

Umpiring career
Tuck stood as an umpire in 90 first-class matches. The first match Tuck stood in was in 1886 when Surrey played Derbyshire. Tuck's final game as a first-class umpire came in 1908 when Hambledon played an England XI in a ceremonial match.

Additionally Tuck stood in seven Minor Counties Championship matches between 1897 and 1902.

Death
Tuck died at Devizes, Wiltshire on 20 January 1918.

External links
James Tuck at Cricinfo
James Tuck at CricketArchive
Matches and detailed statistics for James Tuck

1853 births
1918 deaths
People from Ringwood, Hampshire
English cricketers
Hampshire cricketers
English cricket umpires